Philip Hyde or Hide may refer to:
Philip Hyde (actor) (born 1958), Australian actor
Philip Hyde (photographer) (1921–2006), American landscape photographer
Phil Hyde (cricketer),  Australian cricketer
Philip Hide in 2000 Grand National
Phillip Hyde grant, see Amy Gulick
Phil Hyde, songwriter on My Shiralee
Phil Hyde, candidate in Red Deer municipal election, 2007